Theodor Neijström (September 23, 1883 – July 29, 1948) was a Swedish track and field athlete who competed in the 1908 Summer Olympics. In 1908 he participated in the discus throw competition but his final ranking is unknown.

References

External links
profile 

1883 births
1948 deaths
Swedish male discus throwers
Olympic athletes of Sweden
Athletes (track and field) at the 1908 Summer Olympics